The following is a partial list of lists of academic journals.

Lists of journals

By topic

By country 

 List of 18th-century British periodicals
 List of 19th-century British periodicals
 List of academic journals published in Serbia
 List of journals published by Sri Lankan universities

By publisher 

 List of American Medical Association journals
 List of Annual Reviews journals
 List of Cambridge University Press journals
 List of Elsevier periodicals
 List of IEEE publications
 List of Johns Hopkins University Press journals
 List of MIT Press journals
 List of Oxford University Press journals
 List of Penn State Press journals
 List of Royal Society of Chemistry journals
 List of University of California Press journals
 List of University of Chicago Press journals
 List of University of Texas Press journals

By accessibility 

 List of open-access journals

By chronology 
 List of early-modern periodicals
 List of journals appearing under the French Revolution
 List of 18th-century journals
 List of 18th-century British periodicals
 List of 19th-century British periodicals

By policy 
 List of academic publishers by preprint policy

Other lists 

 Comparison of statistics journals

Published lists

 Guide to Reference
 International Catalogue of Scientific Literature
 Journal Citation Reports
 Ulrich's Periodicals Directory

See also

External links
 

Peer review